David Thomas Broughton vs. 7 Hertz is a collaborative album between David Thomas Broughton and Leeds-based ensemble 7 Hertz. The music was all improvised and recorded in a single take in a church in Leeds. The record was released in 2007 by Acuarela Discos.

Track listing
"Weight of My Love"
"No Great Shakes"
"Jolly (Interlude)"
"Fisted Hand"
"River Outlet"

References

2007 albums
David Thomas Broughton albums
Collaborative albums